Hugo Emil Klaerner (October 15, 1908 – February 3, 1982) was a pitcher in Major League Baseball. He played for the Chicago White Sox. He married Esther Petermann (d. 2009), and is buried in Der Stadt Friedhof Cemetery in Fredericksburg.

References

External links

1908 births
1982 deaths
American people of German descent
Major League Baseball pitchers
Chicago White Sox players
Baseball players from Texas
People from Fredericksburg, Texas